Marie Celeste Dragon (1777–1856) was a wealthy creole slave owner, known for her portrait by José Francisco Xavier de Salazar y Mendoza. She was the wife of Andrea Dimitry. They were an interracial couple. Dragon passed neither as black or white due to her mixed ancestry. She was of Greek-French and African descent. Several incidents occurred in her life dealing with racial inequality and the creole community.

She has been featured in countless articles.  Her likeness is representative of the creole community. She was on the cover of the book Exiles at Home The Struggle to Become American in Creole New Orleans by Shirley Elizabeth Thompson. Two of her creole children attended Georgetown.  Her son Alexander Dimitry was the first person of color to attend Georgetown University and the first person of color to become a U.S. Ambassador. He was Ambassador to Costa Rica and Nicaragua. Her first daughter Euphrosyne married Paul Pandely. Paul's mother Elizabeth English are claimed to be a member of the English royal House of Stuart. Paul's father was of Greek descent.

Early life 
Marianne Dragon was born on March 1, 1777, in New Orleans, Louisiana.  Her father was American Revolutionary War hero Michel Dragon. Dragon migrated from the Greek city of Athens. He arrived in New Orleans during the 1760s. Her mother was a former slave named Marie Françoise Chauvin Beaulieu de Montplaisir. She belonged to Mr. Charles Daprémont de La Lande, a member of the Superior Council. Her family was of African descent. Records indicate that Marianne's parents were married, which was legally prohibitive for an interracial couple.

Records also indicate that both Marianne's parents were slave owners. There are over 36 documented slave records clarifying that Dragon and his wife Françoise Chauvin Beaulieu de Monplaisir were planters. There are also many documented slave trades organized among individuals with the last name Monplaisir.  Some are listed as nègres (in French "of Black African heritage") which is indicative of black slave ownership.  Some if not all may have been related to Marie Francoise.

In 1795, a portrait was painted of the young creole Marianne by famous Mexican painter José Francisco Xavier de Salazar y Mendoza, documenting her appearance and physical characteristics. In marriage records, her mother was listed as a quadroon which is considered highly unlikely due to Marianne's complexion. Older baptismal records documented her mother's race as mulatto.  Around the same period, Marianne met a Greek man named Andrea Dimitry. She wanted to marry him. It was against the law for people of two different races to marry at that time. Documents indicate that the priest Père Antoine read the law prohibiting interracial marriages out loud at the ceremony. He was known for marrying interracial couples, and the wedding proceeded, but cautiously. Marianne was listed as white in marriage records to make it possible for her to legally marry Andrea.  They were married in 1799.  The couple had ten children.

Marriage & Children 
The territory became part of the United States in 1803 with the Louisiana Purchase, and the family became American. They are one of the oldest Creole families in New Orleans history. The family identified with their Greek heritage. Andrea was one hundred percent Greek, and Marianne was fifty percent Greek, so their offspring were seventy-five percent Greek. The family mostly identified as European, reinforcing the stereotype of creole society.

Most of the children married foreigners. There is a family legend that some members of the family traveled to Greece in the 1830s to find spouses for the children. Their first daughter Euphrosine Dimitry married Paul Pandely. Paul's mother Elizabeth English claimed to be a member of the English royal House of Stuart. His father was Greek. Their second daughter Aimèe Manuella Dimitry married a man from France named August Dietz.  He was the former mayor of Martisèe. Marianne's third child was the creole author Alexander Dimitry. He married Mary Powell Mills. She was member of a prominent American family. Her father was famous architect Robert Mills.  He designed the Washington Monument. He later became an abolitionist. Alexander Dimitry was the first person of color to attend Georgetown University. He was also the first person of color to become a U.S. Ambassador.

Her fourth child, Constantine Andrea Dimitry, died at 22 years old in a drowning incident, blind and unmarried. Marianne's fifth child John Baptiste Miguel Dracos Dimitry married Caroline Sophia Powers. Her mother was French. Clino Angelica Dimitry married a prominent Italian surgeon named Giovanni Andrea Pieri, MD. He shared the same name as the revolutionary . Pieri helped Giuseppe Mazzini in the Unification of Italy. The other Pieri supposedly died in France on March 13, 1858. He attempted to assassinate Napoleon III. Both Giovannis studied in France and they also went by the name Giuseppe. There is a possibility that they were the same person. The first Giovanni Pieri died on July 9, 1880.  Marianne's seventh child Marie Francesca Athenais Dimitry had three husbands. Two were French and the final one was an American man.  Their eighth child Nicholas Theodore Dimitry also attended Georgetown like his older brother Alexander Dimitry. Regrettably, he died at a young age. He was twenty-one years old.  Mathilde Elizabeth Theophanie Dimitry married an Italian doctor named Auguste Natili from Pisa, Italy. This is the second Italian to marry into the Dimitry family. Their final child Antoine Marie died unmarried. The Europeanized creole offspring resulted in Greek, Italian, French and English mixtures.

By 1811, the area experienced the largest slave revolt in American history. The revolt occurred thirty miles outside of New Orleans. Slave owners began to dislike the Louisiana free people of color. The local government issued special restrictions for that population. William C. C. Claiborne decreased the number of free men of color in the local militia and set special curfews for people of color. He made free people of color carry special passes. Slave owners of color were also under attack. By the 1830s, white slave owners in Louisiana demanded race distinction.  The segregation system was more about the legal status of people of color.  Marianne's family worked hard to conceal their racial identity. Her children were well educated. Her son Alexander Dimitry spoke eleven languages. The family established a strong Greek community in New Orleans, and by the 1860s, there was a Greek Orthodox Church and a Greek consulate.

Pandely Affair
In 1853, Marienne's grandson George Pandely ran for a seat on the Board of Assistant Aldermen, a municipal body responsible for urban infrastructure in New Orleans, including streets and sidewalks. Pandely's political rival George Wiltz seized on Pandelly's African ancestry to discredit his election, prompting Pandelly to take his opponent to court for slander. The case was dismissed, but the "Pandelly Affair" inspired later generations to invent a new genealogy for themselves in which they claimed descent from a mythical, possibly invented Indian princess of the Alibamu tribe named Malanta Talla.

The incident sent shockwaves throughout the elite family's political identity. Marianne's son Alexander Dimitry had to resign his position as state superintendent of schools. He was the first creole to hold this position. He later became the first person of color to hold the position of U.S. Ambassador.

Later life and death 
Marianne inherited money from her father and later accused Andrea of mismanaging the estate. She took him to court and won a $27,000 settlement. The court siding with Marianne was uncommon because of her mixed-race heritage.

Marianne died on April 22, 1856, in New Orleans, Louisiana. Her body was interred in St. Louis Cemetery No. 1 with her children and their spouses. Marianne was featured in the 2013 book Behind Closed Doors Art in the Spanish American Home, 1492-1898 By Mia L. Bagneris, Michael A. Brown, Suzanne L. Stratton-Pruitt.  Her portrait was on the cover of the 2009 book Exiles at Home by Shirley Elizabeth Thompson.

References

Bibliography
 
 

1777 births
1856 deaths
19th-century American painters
19th-century American women artists
People from New Orleans
Black slave owners in the United States
American slave owners
Louisiana Creole people
People in 19th-century Louisiana
Free people of color
18th-century Greek Americans
19th-century Greek Americans
American women slave owners
People of Colonial Spanish Louisiana
19th-century American businesswomen
19th-century American businesspeople